Epsilon Ceti, Latinized from ε Ceti, is the Bayer designation for a binary star system located in the equatorial constellation of Cetus. It is faintly visible to the naked eye with an apparent visual magnitude of +4.84. Based upon an annual parallax shift of 14.58 mas, it is located around 98 light-years away from the Sun.

This is a line-width spectroscopic binary star system. It has an orbital period of 2.65 years and an eccentricity of 0.23.

Name
This star, along with π Cet, ρ Cet and σ Cet, was Al Sufi's Al Sadr al Ḳaiṭos, the Whale's Breast.

According to the catalogue of stars in the Technical Memorandum 33-507 - A Reduced Star Catalog Containing 537 Named Stars, Al Sadr al Ḳaiṭos were the title for four stars: ρ Cet as Al Sadr al Ḳaiṭos I, σ Cet as Al Sadr al Ḳaiṭos II, this star (ε Cet) as Al Sadr al Ḳaiṭos III and π Cet as Al Sadr al Ḳaiṭos IV.

References

Cetus, Epsilon
Spectroscopic binaries
Cetus (constellation)
Cetus, Epsilon
BD-12 501
Ceti, 83
016620
012390
0781